Big☆Bang!!! is the first album from Shoko Nakagawa released on March 19, 2008. It was distributed by Sony Music. 
While it is presented as her debut album, it follows after two mini-albums, thus being her third release overall. At the same time of the album release, a CD+DVD of the album, including videoclips, was also released.

Track listing

Notes
We Can Do It served as a theme song on TV-show "Urugusu", while Sorairo Days served as an opening theme for the anime Gurren Lagann. Subsequently, snow tears became Habaka Kitaro's ending theme and Brilliant Dream became an opening for Yoshimune.

DVD
 "calling location -image music video-"
 

Shoko Nakagawa albums
Sony Music Entertainment Japan albums
2008 debut albums